Malden Manor railway station, in the Royal Borough of Kingston upon Thames in south London is one of the stations on the Chessington Branch Line, part of the London suburban network of South Western Railway, and is in Travelcard Zone 4.

Like all others on the branch, the station is built in the concrete style of the 1930s (see external link); it was designed by James Robb Scott and opened on 29 May 1938. South-west of the station is a three-span, 140 ft (42m) viaduct over the Hogsmill River, a tributary of the River Thames.

Both platforms were extended to take ten-coach trains on 8 May 2014.

Services

South Western Railway operate half-hourly services between London Waterloo and Chessington South.

Connections
London Buses route S3 and route K1 both serve this station.

References 

Railway stations in the Royal Borough of Kingston upon Thames
Former Southern Railway (UK) stations
Railway stations in Great Britain opened in 1938
Railway stations served by South Western Railway
James Robb Scott buildings